Robotix may refer to:

Events
 Robotix (competition), a robotics competition organized by the students of IIT Kharagpur

Merchandise
 Robotix (toys)

TV
 Robotix, a 1986 cartoon produced by Sunbow & Marvel Productions

See also
robotic, a branch of engineering and science